Glenville School may refer to:

Glenville School (Greenwich, Connecticut), listed on the National Register of Historic Places (NRHP)
Glenville School (Glenville, Nebraska), NRHP-listed